Dindori District, formerly known as Ramgarh District, is a district of Madhya Pradesh state of central India. The town of Dindori is the district headquarters. The district is part of Jabalpur Division. It is located on the eastern part of Madhya Pradesh, bordering the state of Chhattisgarh. It is surrounded by Anuppur district to the northeast, Umaria district to the north, Jabalpur district to the west, Mandla district to the southwest and Mungeli and Kabirdham districts of Chhattisgarh to the south.

Economy
In 2006 the Ministry of Panchayati Raj named Dindori one of the country's 250 most backward districts (out of a total of 640). It is one of the 24 districts in Madhya Pradesh currently receiving funds from the Backward Regions Grant Fund Programme (BRGF).

Demographics

According to the 2011 census, Dindori District has a population of 704,524, roughly equal to the nation of Bhutan or the US state of Alaska. This gives it a ranking of 501st in India (out of a total of 640). Its population growth rate over the decade 2001-2011 was 21.26%. Dindori has a sex ratio of 1,002 females for every 1,000 males, and a literacy rate of 63.90%. 4.59% of the population lives in urban areas. Scheduled Castes and Scheduled Tribes made up 5.65% and 64.69% of the population respectively. Gonds make up around 50% of the district's population.

Languages

At the time of the 2011 Census of India, 82.78% of the population in the district spoke Hindi and 14.09% Gondi as their first language. 1.10% of the population spoke languages recorded as 'Other' under Hindi.

Although most people return their language as "Hindi", the local dialect is mid-way between Chhattisgarhi and Bagheli.

References

External links
Dindori District

 
Districts of Madhya Pradesh